Elmer and Elsie (ELectroMEchanical Robot, Light-Sensitive) were two electronic robots that were built in the late 1940s by neurobiologist and cybernetician William Grey Walter. They were the first robots in history that were programmed to "think" the way biological brains do and meant to have free will.  Elmer and Elsie were often labeled as tortoises because of how they were shaped and the manner in which they moved. They were capable of phototaxis which is the movement that occurs in response to light stimulus.

Description 
Elmer and Elsie, or the "tortoises" as they were known, were constructed between 1948 and 1949 using war surplus materials and old alarm clocks. They had a single light or touch sensor hooked up to two different paths that ran two different motors acting as two separate neuron brains.  The robots had a plastic shell which was phototropic in that it could follow light and act as a bumper sensor.  Walter stressed the importance of using purely analogue electronics to simulate brain processes at a time when his contemporaries such as Alan Turing, John von Neumann and Norbert Wiener were all turning towards a view of mental processes in terms of digital computation.  

The robots were designed to show the interaction between both light-sensitive and touch-sensitive control mechanisms which were basically two nerve cells with visual and tactile inputs. These systems interacted with the motor drive in such a way that the tortoises were actually finding their way around obstacles.   They were allowed to randomly wander around the floor in no specific pattern and when they were presented with two light sources equally distanced from their sensor, they'd head towards whichever light they saw as a consistent part of the scanning process. 

In one experiment a light was placed on the nose of one of the tortoises.  It appeared that the robot was looking at itself in a mirror. Its light began flickering and the robot started shaking as if excited to see itself in the mirror.  Walter argued that if this behavior were seen in an animal it "might be accepted as evidence of some degree of self-awareness."

When presented with certain stimuli, even outside of their programmed range of experience, they responded consistently, as if they had a personality. They had their quirks and odd behaviors the way living things do. Using the only two neurons that they exhibited much of the same behaviors and oddities that any biological beings have.

Legacy 
Elmer and Elsie inspired later generations of robotics researchers such as Rodney Brooks, Hans Moravec and Mark Tilden. Rodney Brooks' "Intelligence without Representation" is in many ways a modern take on Elmer and Elsie. Modern replicas of the tortoises may be found in the form of BEAM robotics.   An original tortoise is on display in London UK in the Science Museum's Making the Modern World gallery. In 1995, one was replicated by Owen Holland, of the University of the West of England, which used some of the original parts. An original tortoise as seen at the Festival of Britain is in the collection of the Smithsonian Institution.

See also
Robotic vacuum cleaner

References

Robots
Cybernetics